WELE (1380 AM) is a commercial radio station broadcasting a progressive news/talk radio format. Licensed to Ormond Beach, Florida, United States, the station serves the Daytona Beach metropolitan area. The station is owned by Bethune-Cookman University.  It is branded as "1380 The Cat".

By day, WELE broadcasts at 5,000 watts, but to avoid interference to other stations on 1380 AM, at night it reduces power to 2,500 watts.  It uses a directional antenna with a four-tower array.  Programming is also heard on 10-watt FM translator W268DG at 101.5 MHz.

Programming
WELE carries a number of nationally syndicated talk shows, including Russ Parr, Stephanie Miller and Democracy Now.  WELE also broadcasts Bethune-Cookman University football and NFL games during the football season.  World and national news is supplied by CBS News Radio.

History
On , the station first signed on the air.  It originally held the call sign WQXQ. It was a daytimer, powered at 1,000 watts and required to go off the air at sunset.  Seeking identification with its target area, in 1969 the call sign was changed to WDAT.  The DAT stood for Daytona. 

Nighttime operations were added in 1973, running 1,000 watts around the clock. In 1977, the station's daytime power was increased to 5,000 watts, and its nighttime power was increased to 2,500 watts. Its call sign was changed to WELE in 1986.

In October 2013, Wings Communications donated the station's license to Bethune-Cookman University. The donation was consummated on August 5, 2014.

References

External links

ELE
Radio stations established in 1957
1957 establishments in Florida
Bethune–Cookman University
News and talk radio stations in the United States
Progressive talk radio